Sunwu County is a county under the administration of Heihe City in the north of Heilongjiang province, China, situated on the bank of Amur River, which demarcates the Sino-Russian border.

Sunwu County is surrounded by Lesser Khingan Mountains, and its forest coverage is 45%. The urbanization level is 40%.

Geography and climate

Sunwu County has a monsoon-influenced humid continental climate (Köppen Dwb) with very warm, humid summers and severely cold, extremely dry winters. More than three-fourths of the annual precipitation occurs from June to September. With monthly percent possible sunshine ranging from 52% in July to 73% in February, the area receives 2,576 hours of bright sunshine annually.

Administrative divisions
There are two towns and nine townships in the county: 

Towns:
Sunwu, Chenqing

Townships:
Xixing Township, Yanjiang Manchu Township, Yaotun Township, Woniuhe Township, Qunshan Township, Fendou Township, Hongqi Township, Zhengyangshan Township, Qingxi Township

Transport
China National Highway 202
Beihei Railway

References

External links
 Official site of Sunwu County

County level divisions of Heilongjiang
Heihe